Barbados competed at the 2020 Summer Olympics in Tokyo. Originally scheduled to take place from 24 July to 9 August 2020, the Games were postponed to 23 July to 8 August 2021, because of the COVID-19 pandemic. It was the nation's thirteenth appearance at the Summer Olympics, having competed at every Games since its debut in 1968 with the exception of the 1980 Summer Olympics in Moscow, because of its partial support to the United States-led boycott.

Competitors
The following is the list of number of competitors in the Games.

Athletics

Barbadian athletes achieved the entry standards, either by qualifying time or by world ranking, in the following track and field events (up to a maximum of 3 athletes in each event):

Track & road events

Swimming

Barbados received a universality invitation from FINA to send two top-ranked swimmers (one per gender) in their respective individual events to the Olympics, based on the FINA Points System of June 28, 2021.

See also
Barbados at the 2019 Pan American Games

References

Nations at the 2020 Summer Olympics
2020
2021 in Barbadian sport